The World Health Professions Alliance is an international organization which represents than 31 million health care professionals worldwide. The Alliance unites dentistry, medicine, nursing, physical therapy and pharmacy through their representative international organizations, the International Council of Nurses (ICN), the International Pharmaceutical Federation (FIP), the World Confederation for Physical Therapy, the FDI World Dental Federation and the World Medical Association (WMA).

The WHPA was formed between ICN, FDI and WMA in 1999 as an alliance to address global health issues, with the secretariat being run from the ICN. FDI World Dental Federation was added to the Alliance in 2005 and the World Confederation for Physical Therapy joined in 2014. The aim of the organization is to facilitate collaboration between key health professionals and major international stakeholders such as governments, policymakers and the World Health Organization. The Alliance operates under the philosophy that by working in collaboration, instead of along parallel tracks, the patient and health care system benefit.

Since the creation of the alliance the WHPA has taken active and leading roles in fostering patient safety, advocating a positive practice environment in the health care setting, human resource issues, regulation of the health professions, human rights in medicine, producing a core competency framework for international health consultants and discussing the future of healthcare. Other activities have involved combating counterfeit medicines, condemning the stigma associated with mental illness, multi-drug-resistant tuberculosis and tobacco.

It regularly holds a Regulation Conference and Leadership Forum.

The WHPA Secretariat is hosted at the FDI World Dental Federation in Geneva, Switzerland.

References

External links

Medical and health organizations based in France
International medical and health organizations
International organizations based in France